Oakwood Heights may refer to the following locations:
Oakwood Heights (Detroit)
Oakwood, Staten Island
Oakwood Heights (Staten Island Railway station)